Dust to Dust (2000) is a novel by Tami Hoag. Contrasting the moral issues of the turn of the century's society with the sexuality of high-profile civil servants, it sets the scene for an apparent lack of understanding in today's world for the alternative person. It is the second novel in the three part Kovac/Liska Series.

Plot
Andy Fallon, Internal Affairs cop and son of police legend, "Iron" Mike Fallon, is found hanging nude in his bedroom, facing a mirror with the word "sorry" printed on it. Was it a suicide, an erotic accident, or murder? Sam Kovac and Nikki Liska, two of Minneapolis' toughest detectives are told to exploit the case, call it an accident and move on. But Kovac isn't convinced and when Iron Mike is found dead a few days later, another apparent suicide, Kovac and Liska stop listening to the brass, put their careers on the line and start their own investigation. As they begin to dig, they uncover cover ups, a connection to a twenty-year-old case and a killer who wants to keep the secrets of the past dead and buried.

References

External links
The Author's Official Website

Novels by Tami Hoag
2000 American novels
American thriller novels
Novels set in Minneapolis